Thomas Gore (1870–1949) was an American senator from Oklahoma.

Thomas Gore may also refer to:
Thomas Gore (writer) (1632–1684), English writer on heraldry
Thomas Gore (MP), English politician from Berkshire
Tommy Gore (born 1953), English footballer